Kolga Bay Landscape Conservation Area is a nature park situated in Harju County, Estonia.

Its area is 1933 ha.

The protected area was designated in 1991 to protect Kolga Bay and its surrounding areas. In 1999, the protected area was redesigned to the landscape conservation area.

References

Nature reserves in Estonia
Geography of Harju County